Invasive species in Florida are introduced organisms that cause damage to the environment, human economy, or human health in Florida. Native plants and animals can become threatened by from the spread of invasive species.

Animals

Mammals

Brown rat (Rattus norvegicus)
Black rat (R. rattus)
Chital (Axis axis)
Coypu or nutria (Myocastor coypus)
House mouse (Mus musculus)
Wild boar (Sus scrofa) 
Feral cat (Felis catus)
Capybara (Hydrochoerus hydrochaeris) 
Red fox (Vulpes vulpes)
Mexican gray squirrel (Sciurus aureogaster)
Rhesus macaque (Macaca mulatta)
Nine-banded armadillo (Dasypus novemcinctus)

Birds
House sparrow (Passer domesticus)
Muscovy duck (Cairina moschata)
Feral pigeon (Columba livia domestica)
Red-whiskered bulbul (Pycnonotus jocosus)
Indian peacock (Pavo cristatus)
European starling (Sturnus vulgaris)

Reptiles
Argentine black and white tegu (Salvator merianae)
Black spiny-tailed iguana (Ctenosaura similis)
Brown anole (Anolis sagrei)
Burmese python (Python bivittatus) see main article: Burmese pythons in Florida
Common house gecko (Hemidactylus frenatus)
Green iguana (Iguana iguana)
Mediterranean gecko (Hemidactylus turcicus)
Nile monitor (Varanus niloticus)
Red-eared slider (Trachemys scripta elegans)
Common boa (Boa constrictor)
African rock python (Python sebae)

Amphibians
Cane toad (Rhinella marina)
Common coquí (Eleutherodactylus coqui)
Cuban tree frog (Osteopilus septentrionalis)
Greenhouse frog (Eleutherodactylus planirostris)

Fish
African jewelfish (Hemichromis letourneuxi)
Asian swamp eel (Monopterus albus)
Blue tilapia (Oreochromis aureus)
Black acara (Cichlasoma bimaculatum)
Bullseye snakehead (Channa marulius)
Clown featherback (Chitala ornata)
Lionfish (Pterois miles & P. volitans)
Mayan cichlid (Cichlasoma urophthalmum)
Northern snakehead (Channa argus)
Oscar (Astronotus ocellatus)
Pike killifish (Belonesox belizanus)
Spotted tilapia (Pelmatolapia mariae)
Walking catfish (Clarias batrachus)
Yellowfin goby (Acanthogobius flavimanus)
Asian carp (Cyprinus carpio)

Invertebrates
 Metamasius callizona (Mexican bromeliad weevil) Potential Biodiversity Loss in Florida Bromeliad Phytotelmata due to Metamasius callizona (Coleoptera: Dryophthoridae), an Invasive Species
 Euglossa dilemma (green orchid bee) green orchid bee - Euglossa dilemma Friese
 Pomacea maculata (island applesnail) giant applesnail (Pomacea maculata) - Species Profile
 Corbicula fluminea (Asian clam) Asian clam (Corbicula fluminea) - Species Profile
 Lissachatina fulica (African giant land snail) New York Invasive Species Information – New York State's gateway to science-based invasive species information
 Marisa cornuarietis (Colombian ramshorn apple snail) Marisa cornuarietis (giant ramshorn)
 Melanoides tuberculata (Red-rimmed melania) Melanoides tuberculata (red-rimmed melania)
 Zachrysia provisoria (Cuban brown snail) Zachrysia provisoria (Cuban brown snail)
 Platydemus manokwari (New Guinea flatworm) Invasive New Guinea flatworm surfaces in PBC
 Amynthas agrestis (Crazy worm) Amynthas agrestis (crazy worm)
 Aedes albopictus (Asian tiger mosquito) Aedes albopictus (Asian tiger mosquito)
 Aethina tumida (Small hive beetle) Aethina tumida
 Anastrepha suspensa (Caribbean fruit fly) Anastrepha suspensa (Caribbean fruit fly)
 Aphis spiraecola (Spirea aphid) Aphis spiraecola (Spirea aphid)
 Apis mellifera scutellata (African bee) Apis mellifera scutellata (africanized bee)
 Aulacaspis yasumatsui (Cycad aulacaspis scale) Aulacaspis yasumatsui (cycad aulacaspis scale)
 Cactoblastis cactorum (Cactus moth) Cactoblastis cactorum (cactus moth)
 Cerataphis lataniae (Palm aphid) Cerataphis lataniae (palm aphid)
 Cnestus mutilatus (Camphor shot borer) Xylosandrus mutilatus (camphor shoot beetle)
 Coptotermes formosanus (Formosan subterranean termite) Coptotermes formosanus (Formosan subterranean termite)
 Coptotermes gestroi (Asian subterranean termite)
 Cryptotermes brevis (Powderpost termite) Cryptotermes brevis (powderpost termite)
 Culex quinquefasciatus (Southern house mosquito) Culex quinquefasciatus (southern house mosquito)
 Dinoderus minutus (Bamboo borer) Dinoderus minutus (bamboo borer)
 Glycaspis brimblecombei (Red gum lerp psyllid) Glycaspis brimblecombei (red gum lerp psyllid)
 Harmonia axyridis (Harlequin ladybird) Harmonia axyridis (harlequin ladybird)
 Heterotermes cardini (West Indian subterranean termite)
 Hypogeococcus pungens (Cactus mealybug) Hypogeococcus pungens (cactus mealybug)
 Icerya purchasi (Cottony cushion scale) Icerya purchasi (cottony cushion scale)
 Incisitermes minor (Western drywood termite)
 Leptocybe invasa (Blue gum chalcid wasp) Leptocybe invasa (blue gum chalcid)
 Linepithema humile (Argentine ant) Linepithema humile (Argentine ant)
 Maconellicoccus hirsutus (Pink hibiscus mealybug) Maconellicoccus hirsutus (pink hibiscus mealybug)
 Nasutitermes corniger (Conehead termite)
 Opogona sacchari (Banana moth) Opogona sacchari (banana moth)
 Paratachardina pseudolobata (Lobate lac scale) Paratachardina pseudolobata (lobate lac scale)TNC Global Invasive Species Team page
 Pheidole megacephala (Big-headed ant) Pheidole megacephala (big-headed ant)
 Phenacoccus solenopsis (Cotton mealybug) Phenacoccus solenopsis (cotton mealybug)
 Raoiella indica (Red palm mite) Raoiella indica (red palm mite)
 Solenopsis invicta (Red imported fire ant) Solenopsis invicta (red imported fire ant)
 Tapinoma melanocephalum (Ghost ant) Tapinoma melanocephalum (ghost ant)
 Trichomyrmex destructor (Singapore ant) Monomorium destructor (Singapore ant)
 Wasmannia auropunctata (Electric ant) Wasmannia auropunctata (little fire ant)
 Xanthogaleruca luteola (Elm leaf beetle) Pyrrhalta luteola (elm leaf beetle)
 Xyleborinus saxeseni (Fruit-tree pinhole borer) Xyleborinus saxesenii (fruit-tree pinhole borer)
 Xylosandrus compactus (Black twig borer) Xylosandrus compactus (shot-hole borer)
 Xylosandrus crassiusculus (Asian ambrosia beetle) Xylosandrus crassiusculus (Asian ambrosia beetle)
 Bugula neritina (Brown bryozoan) Bugula neritina (brown bryozoan)
 Polyandrocarpa zorritensis Polyandrocarpa zorritensis
 Cordylophora caspia (Euryhaline hydroid) Cordylophora (euryhaline hydroid)
 Tubastraea coccinea (Orange cup coral) Tubastraea coccinea (orange-cup coral)

Plants
According to the non-governmental organisation FLEPPC, the invasive species of plant in 2019 are the following list. Compared to older lists, a number of species have been removed when it became more apparent that they were in fact native to Florida or that their impact was less severe than feared by the organisation, while three or four species have been added in the last decade or so, and two species were originally misidentified. There are many more exotic species in Florida which occur as ornamental garden plants or garden escapes. FLEPPC has no legal authority, this list is merely a recommendation. In Florida, a number of plant species are declared invasive species by either state of federal legislature. Most of these are water plants which are not listed below.

See also
Invasive species in the United States
List of invasive species in the Everglades

References

Invasive species
Florida
Invasive species